Ronaldo is a Portuguese given name equivalent to the English Ronald. It became a common name in all Portuguese-speaking countries, being also prevalent in Italy and Spanish-speaking countries.

People 
Notable people known as Ronaldo include:

Association footballers
 Ronaldo, full name Ronaldo Luís Nazário de Lima (born 1976), Brazilian footballer, was known as "Ronaldinho" in his early career
 Cristiano Ronaldo (born 1985), Portuguese footballer
 Ronaldinho, full name Ronaldo de Assis Moreira (born 1980), Brazilian footballer, also known as "Ronaldinho Gaúcho"
 Ronaldo Cezar Soares dos Santos (born 2000), Brazilian footballer
 Ronaldo da Silva Souza (born 1996), Brazilian footballer
 Ronaldo de Oliveira Strada (born 1996), Brazilian football goalkeeper
 Ronaldo Deaconu (born 1997), Romanian footballer
 Ronaldo Guiaro (born 1974), Brazilian footballer
 Ronaldo Giovanelli (born 1967), Brazilian football goalkeeper and pundit
 Ronaldo Henrique Ferreira da Silva (born 1994), Brazilian footballer
 Ronaldo Henrique Silva (born 1991), Brazilian footballer
 Ronaldo Kwateh (born 2004), Indonesian footballer
 Ronaldo Lumungo Afonso (born 2000), Santomean football winger
 Ronaldo Maczinski (born 1980), Brazilian footballer
 Ronaldo Marques Sereno (born 1962), Brazilian football forward
 Ronaldo Oliveira (born 1997), an Indian footballer
 Ronaldo Pereira Alves (born 1977), Brazilian footballer
 Ronaldo Pompeu da Silva (born 1990), Brazilian football midfielder
 Ronaldo Rodrigues de Jesus (born 1965), Brazilian footballer also known as Ronaldão

Other people
 Ronaldo da Costa (born 1970), Brazilian long-distance runner
 Ronaldo Mulitalo (born 1999), New Zealand-American Samoan rugby league player
 Ronaldo Munck, Argentine sociologist
 Ronaldo Puno, (born 1948), Filipino campaign manager
 Ronaldo Souza (born 1979), Brazilian mixed martial artist and submission grappler
 Ronaldo Zamora (born 1944), Filipino lawyer and politician

Fictional characters
 Ronaldo Fryman, a supporting character in the Steven Universe cartoon series

See also
 Rolando (disambiguation)

References

Italian masculine given names
Spanish masculine given names
Portuguese masculine given names